Briegel is a surname of German origin. It may refer to:

Eva Briegel (born 1978), German singer and member of the rock band Juli
Hans-Peter Briegel (born 1955), former German footballer and manager
Wolfgang Carl Briegel (1626–1712), German organist, teacher, and composer

Surnames of German origin
German toponymic surnames